Hawk(e): The Movie is an independent comedy film co-directed by Phil Baker and Tom Turner and written by Phil Baker. The film was produced by Genepool Records with Paramore Productions and is set for a summer 2013 release. The film is to be distributed by Genepool in the UK and Continuum Motion Pictures in North America.

Plot 

Movie-maker-come-idiot Mike Hawk sets about making his latest movie, a Rom-Com called "Get Becky Laid", and is followed in his pursuits by documentary maker and film fanatic Philip K Longfellow. 
Mike Hawk also plays the lead character and has named him Mike Hawke - after himself only adding another 'e' to his name to distinguish the two.
Mike's bitten off more than he can chew, and is followed as he gets through the making of the film, achieving it only through sheer determination and ignorance.

Additional Details 

Hawk(e): The Movie is due for release Summer 2013. It was shot in and around Plymouth with Principal photography taking place in October and early November 2010.

Cast 

 Mike Hawk(e): Phil Baker
 Philip K Longfellow: Martin Ross
 Scarlett Foxx/Becky: Chelsea-Marie Gall
 Archie Bishop: Darren Lake
 William Yung/Weepole: Paul Gentle
 Rachael Hoskins/Kirsty: Lucy Harvey
 Sandra Cox/Sandy: Kokil Sharma
 Richard “Dick” Dickson: Dan McNeill
 Max Willey: Richard Silverwood
 Richard Holder: Mark Smalley
 Richard Daley: Michael Terry
 Richard Payne: Tom Turner
 Richard Long: Dan Leahy
 Richard Hunter: John Elliott
 PC Richards: Richard Haighton

Crew 

 Director Of Photography: Mikey Parkinson
 Camera Operators: Tom Turner/Mikey Parkinson
 Editor: Thomas Turner
 Sound Recordists: Phil Baker/Carl Jones
 Sound Engineers: Deep Blue Sound
 Assistant Crew: Rich Silverwood
 Production Photographer: Oliver Joy/Mikey Parkinson
 Additional Featured Stills Photographers: James Baker
 Hair: Karen Shilstone
 Make-up: Carole Dodge
 Effects Make-up: Jon Haye
 Costume Consultant: Laura Backhouse
 Original Featured Songs: Phil Baker
 Original Songs Engineers: Doc Collins/Phil Baker
 Original Song Backing Singer: Nick Lemanis
 Propmaker: Jon Haye
 Graphic Design : Mikey Parkinson
 Double for Miss Gall: Lizzi Gabe-Thomas
 Insurance provided by Allan Chapman & James Insurance Brokers Ltd
 Executive Producers: Phil Baker & Pete Genepool

Soundtrack 

The film's soundtrack includes tracks from Cosmo Jarvis, Leeroy Thornhill of The Prodigy, Kat Marsh - a performer also known for her time as bass player in The King Blues, as well as director Phil Baker's band Lemanis, and other Plymouth based bands such as The Wildcards. Two tracks were also written and recorded specifically for the movie, one of which was performed by Darren Lake, one of the lead cast.

References 

http://www.devon-cornwall-film.co.uk/2011/02/08/plymouth-comedy-hawke-trailer-released-dcfilm-speaks-to-director-phil-baker/

2012 films
American independent films
2012 comedy films
2010s American films